Hazal Adıyaman (born 6 August 1989) is a Turkish actress best known for her roles as 'Gül' in Muhteşem Yüzyıl, 'Derin Çelik' in Bizim Hikaye, and 'Princess Adelfa' in Kuruluş: Osman.

Life and career
Adıyaman has a bachelor's degree in Physics from Marmara University. She started her career as an actress in 2013 when she played a recurring role as Gül on the series Muhteşem Yüzyıl. She then played the role of Melek on an episode of the series Aşkın Bedeli in the same year. Adıyaman gained attention when she starred in the drama series Bizim Hikaye by playing the role of Derin Çelik, the younger sister of Deniz Çelik (portrayed by Melisa Döngel). In 2020, she appeared as Princess Adelfa in Kuruluş: Osman. Adıyaman is also known in the Turkish media for her natural beauty.

Filmography

Television series

Film

References

External links 
 

1994 births
Turkish television actresses
21st-century Turkish actresses
Actresses from Istanbul
Living people